Truth (NZ) Ltd v Avery [1959] NZLR 274 is a cited case regarding the defence of honest opinion in defamation.

References

New Zealand contract case law
New Zealand tort case law
1958 in New Zealand law
1958 in case law
Court of Appeal of New Zealand cases